Gusheh-ye Sofla (also Romanized as Gūsheh-ye Soflá and Gūsheh-e Soflá; also known as Gūsheh) is a village in Poshteh-ye Zilayi Rural District, Sarfaryab District, Charam County, Kohgiluyeh and Boyer-Ahmad Province, Iran. At the 2006 census, its population was 118, in 21 families.

References 

Populated places in Charam County